Williella picdupina is a species of moth of the family Tortricidae. It is found in New Caledonia in the southwest Pacific Ocean.

The wingspan is about 22 mm. The forewings are cream brown, strigulated (finely streaked) and reticulated (net like) with brown. The hindwings are greyish brown.

References

Moths described in 2013
Archipini